Edwin L. Hollywood (October 9, 1892 – May 15, 1958) was an American actor and film director. He was born in New York City.

Hollywood was in charge of  Vitagraph's film unit that starred Harry Morey.

He died in Glendale, California.

Filmography

Actor
The Heart of the Blue Ridge (1915)

Director
One Hour (1917)
[[Polly of the Circus (1917 film)|Polly of the Circus]] (1917), Charles Thomas Horan also directedThe Challenge Accepted (1918)The Birth of a Soul (1920)The Sea Rider (1920)The Flaming Clue (1920)The Gauntlet (1920)The Birth of a Soul (1920)French Heels (1922)No Trespassing (1922)Columbus (1923)The Pilgrims (1924)

References

Further reading
Obituary, May 17, 1948, New York Times''
Hollywood Signs with Associated, Moving Picture World (US)	May 30, 1925, page 554
Hollywood Resigns, Moving Picture World,	April 1, 1922, page 465
Hollywood to Direct Morey, Moving Picture World, September 13, 1919, page 1662
Hollywood Directs Arden Subject, Moving Picture World, December 28, 1918, page 1488

1958 deaths
1892 births
Film directors from New York City